ŠK Cementáreň Lietavská Lúčka is a Slovak football team, based in the town of Lietavská Lúčka.

External links 
Official website

References

Cementaren Lietavska Lucka
Association football clubs established in 1917